Strambelli is an Italian surname. Notable people with the surname include:

Nicola Strambelli (born 1988), Italian footballer
Nicoletta Strambelli (born 1948), better known as Patty Pravo, Italian singer

Italian-language surnames